Chirag Jain (born May 27, 1985) is an Indian poet, satirist, humourist and author, who writes and performs in Hindi. His performance has appeared in various TV shows including Sab TV's Wah Wah Kya Baat Hai, Sahara One's Laugh India Laugh, Aaj Tak's KV Sammelan, News 18's Netaji Lapete Mein and News Nation's Chunavi Chakallas.

He has authored more than 7 books including Koi Yoon Hi Nahi Chubhta, Os, Man To Gomukh Hai, Chhookar Nikli Hai Bechaini.

On September 14, 2016, Chirag Jain received the Bhashadoot Samman (award) by the Hindi Academy, Government of Delhi on the occasion of Hindi Divas for his contribution in popularizing the Hindi language through the digital medium.

Early life and career  
Chirag was born in 1985 in New Delhi, India. He has done a bachelor's degree in Mass Communication from the University of Delhi and holds a master's degree from Vardhaman Mahaveer Open University, Kota.  He has recited his poetry during Kavi sammelan on Red Fort and other cities across India.

Jain came out with his debut poetry collection, Koi Yoon Hi Nahi Chubhta, published by Shilpayan Prakashan in 2008, He published his second poetry collection, Os, followed by Man To Gomukh Hai, Jaago Phir Ek Baar, Pahli Dastak, Doosari Dastak and Chhookar Nikli Hai Bechaini.

Chirag Jain has recited his humorous poetry at SAB TV comedy poetry show, Wah! Wah! Kya Baat Hai! and Sahara One's Laugh India Laugh in 2012. He also performed at KV Sammelan on Aaj Tak in 2019. He has been featured in numerous poetry-based TV shows Aaj Tak's KV Sammelan, News 18's Netaji Lapete Mein and News Nation's Chunavi Chakallas. Jain is a founder member and joint secretary of Kavi Sammelan Samiti.

Bibliography 
 "Koi Yoon Hi Nahi Chubhta", (2008) Publisher: Shilpayan Prakashan 
 "Os", Publisher: Pankhi Prakashan 
 "Man To Gomukh Hai", (2015), Publisher: Pankhi Prakashan  
 "Jaago Phir Ek Baar", Publisher: Rashtriya Kavi Sangam 
 "Pahli Dastak", Publisher: Pankhi Prakashan 
 "Doosari Dastak", Publisher: Pankhi Prakashan  
 "Chhookar Nikli Hai Bechaini", (2018), Publisher: Remadhav Art

Television

Awards and recognition 
 Bhashadoot Samman by the Hindi Academy, Government of Delhi, 2016
 Saraswat Award by Janki Devi College, University of Delhi, 2016
 Shabda Sadhak Award by the Rotary Club, Delhi, 2016
 Lekhak Award by the Writers & Journalists Association, Delhi, 2014
 Hindi Sevi Award by the Bharat Vikas Parishad, New Delhi, 2014
 Kavihridaya Award by the Indian Medical Association, 2013
 Chhupa Rustam Award at Wah Wah Kya Baat Hai, SAB TV, 2013
 Jagdish Mittal Award by the Rashtriya Kavi Sangam, 2009

See also 

 List of Hindi-language poets
 List of Hindi-language authors

References

External links 
 
 Chirag Jain's Poetry on Amar Ujala
 लाफ्टर डे पर भी नहीं हंसेगे? लीजिए हंसी की खुराक... at Navbharat Times

Living people
Indian satirists
Indian humorists
21st-century Indian poets
1985 births
People from Delhi